Minotaure was a Surrealist-oriented magazine founded by Albert Skira and E. Tériade in Paris and published between 1933 and 1939. Minotaure published on the plastic arts, poetry, and literature, avant garde, as well as articles on esoteric and unusual aspects of literary and art history. Also included were psychoanalytical studies and artistic aspects of anthropology and ethnography. It was a lavish and extravagant magazine by the standards of the 1930s, profusely illustrated with high quality reproductions of art, often in color.

History
The review was originally founded by E. Tériade (Stratis Eleftheriadis) and Albert Skira with the desire to produce a lavish magazine on "The plastic arts - poetry - music - architecture -  ethnography and mythology - theater - psychoanalytical studies and observations." Although not intended to be strictly a surrealist review, Albert Skira had been associating with André Breton and others in the movement and invited their input, even before the first issue was published. Skira's only restriction for Breton was that he not use the review as a forum to advocate his political views. The original editor was E. Tériade, but that role was soon taken over by Skira, who formed an editorial committee that included André Breton, Marcel Duchamp, Paul Eluard, Maurice Heine, and Pierre Mabille, giving it a heavy surrealist bias early on. E. Tériade remained involved as the artistic director for several years, but ultimately departed in December 1937, in part due to the ever-increasing surrealist direction of the review, which only left Minotaure under the even greater influence of André Breton and the surrealist. By 1939 André Breton had a falling out with Paul Eluard, and Eluard and Marcel Duchamp left the editorial committee as well. Breton had virtually taken over editorship of Minotaure by the 1939 issue, however his tenure was short lived with the outbreak of World War II, an exodus of surrealist to the United States, and Albert Skira's return to Switzerland in the following months.

The name Minotaure is attributed to Georges Bataille and André Masson, suggested "during a meeting with [Roger] Vitrac, [Robert] Desnos, and E. Tériade, who were in favor of calling the review L'Age d'Or." The theme of the Minotaur and/or the labyrinth, had already appeared in the work of several artist and writers including Georges Bataille, André Breton, Max Ernst, André Masson, as well as a number of drawings that Pablo Picasso had made on Greek mythology subjects. In the age of Freud, the metaphor of the Minotaur and the labyrinth had been popular in several circles of intellectuals in the 1920s and 1930s; the labyrinth being analogous to the mind, the Minotaur representing mysterious irrational impulses hidden within, and Theseus - the conscious mind, entering the labyrinth and slaying the Minotaur, emerging victorious, - with a greater self-knowledge; a paradigm for psychoanalyst and the surrealist theater as well.

Minotaure was a luxurious review in its day, featuring original artworks on the cover by prominent artists like Matisse, Picasso, Duchamp, Miró, and Dalí, and it grew more lavish with each passing year. Some volumes had various entries printed on papers of different colors, textures, and thicknesses bound into one. The drawings of artist were sometimes reproduced on fine art papers, like the originals. Later volumes featured color insets, high quality tipped-in color plates, an element that was later to become a trademark in Skira's art book series published after the war. Minotaure had 800 subscribers when the first issue was published in June 1933. The original selling price was 25 francs (no. 1–9), going up to 30 francs (no. 10–11), with the double issues selling for 40 francs (no. 3/4) and 60 francs (no, 12/13). Due to financial difficulties it was published at irregular intervals. The British art patron/collector and poet, Edward James soon came to be an important sponsor and adviser of the magazine. With an international circulation in several European counties, the journal was a significant element in Surrealism's rise form a relatively obscure circle of poets, artist, and intellectuals in the 1920s to a major movement of twentieth century art. It is a significant and historical reference for information on surrealism and has been the subject of two facsimile reprints. It was one in a succession of surrealist reviews including  La Révolution Surréaliste (1924-1929) and Le Surrealisme au service de la revolution (1930-1933), Minotaure (1933-1939) and VVV (1942-1944). Minotaure was by far the most lavish, inclusive, and widely distributed of the four.

Contributors and content
Minotaure published original poetry, automatic writing, fiction, and high quality reproductions of artworks, as well as important essays and writings on surrealist theory and philosophy. In addition to the writings of André Breton, Paul Eluard, and Benjamin Péret; Salvador Dalí, often underestimated as a writer, contributed essays to eight issues, including writings on art theory like his paranoid-critical technique. Maurice Heine, one of the editorial committee members, was a major figure in rediscovering and publishing the work of the Marquis de Sade and he produced articles for most volumes of Minotaure. The participation of E. Tériade added a significant dimension to Minotaure, with contributions in most of the issues on art and artist beyond the surrealist movement, like Matisse and Fauvism. Surrealist views on architecture were presented in articles by Tristan Tzara, Salvador Dalí, and Roberto Matta, . Other poets and writers included Georges Bataille, Jacques Brunius, René Crevel, Léon Paul Fargue, Georges Hugnet, Edward James, Marcel Jean, Henri Michaux, Jacques Prévert, Herbert Read, and Pierre Reverdy.

Several important artists of the twentieth century received some of their earliest, or first recognition in Minotaure like Hans Bellmer and his doll, Victor Brauner, Paul Delvaux, Alberto Giacometti, Roberto Matta, Kurt Seligmann, and Frida Kahlo. The Balthus painting The Street (1933, Museum of Modern Art, New York) was reproduced for the first time in Minotaure. Minotaure was the first to reproduce Picasso's sculptures too. Mexican print maker José Guadalupe Posada was featured in one issue. Many important photographers contributed regularly or were featured in the journal including Bill Brandt, Brassai, Dora Maar, Man Ray, and Raoul Ubac. Other diverse and unexpected figures such as Le Corbusier, André Derain, and Ambroise Vollard all contributed articles at one time or another, as did composers Kurt Weill and Igor Markevitch.

Physician and writer Pierre Mabille, with expertise on anthropology, sociology and medicine was on the editorial committee and contributed articles to many of the volumes. Concordantly, Minotaure kept an "open house to the essays" from a wide range of philosophers, psychologists, anthropologist, historians, and other specialists including Jean Wahl, Roger Caillois, Pierre Courthion, and Michel Leiris. Minotaure published the first essays of Jacques Lacan, the noted French psychiatrist and philosopher. The entire second issue was devoted to Mission Dakar-Djibouti, an expedition to Africa commissioned by the French state and conducted by the Musée d'Ethnographie du Trocadéro under the direction of Marcel Griaule from 1931 to 1933. This science-based, anthropological project was conducted to survey, document, collect, and examine, ethnographic dances, music, paintings, arts, and cultures of Africa, although it was not without some political and economic motivations, bolstering the French colonial position in Africa in opposition to the growing British influence there. More than 3,000 objects were deposited in the museum, along with 6,000 photographs, 1,600 meters of films, and extensive field notes; many of which were featured in Minotaure.

Facsimile reprints 
Two facsimile editions of the complete 13 volume journal have been published. The first facsimile was published in 1968 by Arno Press, New York, with an introduction in English and French by Albert Skira. The Arno Press edition was in four red cloth hardcover volumes (13 x 11 in.), including illustrations, advertisements and a cumulative index: Vol, I 1933; Vol. II, 1934–1935; Vol. III, 1936–1937, Vol. IV, 1938–1939. The second facsimile edition was published in 1981 by Editions d'art Albert Skira/Imprimeries Reunies, Geneve-Lausanne. The Skira facsimile edition, Minotaure. Revue artistique et litteraire, was published in quarto (4to) format (12.6 x 10 in.), hardbound with dust jackets and slipcases in three volumes: Vol. I, 1933; Vol. II, 1934–1936; Vol. III, 1936–1939.

Minotaure volumes and tables of contents

No. 1: June 1, 1933 
Cover by Pablo Picasso: 
Pierre Reverdy,  [The Art of Russian] . 
Paul Éluard,  [A Face in the Grass]. 
Maurice Raynal, . 
André Breton, . 
E. Tériade,  [Paintings]. 
René Crevel,  [The Art of Art]. 
Marcel Jean, . 
E. Tériade, Marcel Jean,  [The Omens, ballet by André Masson]. 
Max Raphael,  [About the Corfu pediment]. 
André Breton,  [Picasso in his Element]. 
André Breton, . 
Pablo Picasso,  [An Anatomy]. 
Pierre Reverdy,  [Eternal Note of the Present]. 
Maurice Raynal,  [Variety of the Human Body]. 
E. Tériade,  [Plastic Value Movement]. 
Max Raphael,  [Notes on the Baroque]. 
Maurice Heine, . 
D. A. F. de Sade, . 
André Masson: . 
Paul Éluard,  [The Mirror of Baudelaire]. 
Salvador Dalí,  [Paranoid-critical Interpretation of the haunting image The Angelus of Millet]. 
Jacques M. É. Lacan,  [The Problem of Style and Paranoid Forms of Experience]. 
Kurt Weill,  [The Seven Deadly Sins]. 
 [Set of preparatory drawings by Henri Matisse for "The Afternoon of a Fauna" by Stéphane Mallarmé]. 
Michel Leiris,  [Dogon Funeral Dances].

No. 2: June 1, 1933

Cover by Gaston-Louis Roux. 
Mission Dakar-Djibouti: Paul Rivet and Georges-Henri Rivière, . [Ethnographic and Linguistic Mission Dakar-Djibouti]. 
Marcel Griaule,  [Methodological introduction]. 
Eric Lutten,  [The "Wasamba" and their use of the circumcision]. 
Marcel Griaule,  [The hunter of October 20 (Funeral ceremonies at the Dogon of the cliff of Bandiagara, French Sudan)]. 
André Schaeffner, . [Notes on the music of the populations of northern Cameroon]. 
Deborah Lifszyc [Lifchitz],  [Ethiopian Amulets]. 
Michel Leiris, . [The bull of Seyfou Tchenger (a sacrifice to zar geniuses in a sect of possessed, in Gondar, Abyssinia)] 
Documents on. 
 [Making boxes on the banks of the (Niger Basin)]. 
 [Masks and dance helmets from French Sudan]. 
 [Carved locks from French West Africa]. 
 [Dogon masks and ritual objects (French Sudan)]. 
 [Rock paintings of Songo (French Sudan)]. 
 [Sculptures, engraved calabashes and pottery from Dahomey]. 
 [Ancient Paintings of Upper Ethiopia], etc.
Numerous reproductions of scenes, types, sites, objects, and various documents relating to the regions traversed by the Mission.

No. 3-4: December 12, 1933

Cover by André Derain: 
Man Ray,  [The Age of Light]. 
Man Ray,  [Portraits of Women]. 
Nadar,  [Portraits of Women]. 
Brassai,  [From the Cave Wall to the Factory Wall]. 
André Derain,  [Criterium of Aces]. 
E. Tériade,  [Emancipation of Painting, Chance spontaneity and lack of style in modern painting. Four plates in colors. Thirty unpublished reproductions of] Picasso, Matisse, Braque, Derain, Miro, Borés, Dalí, Beaudin. 
Pr. Ed. Claparéde,  [Sleep Defense Reaction]. 
Dr. Jacques Lacan,  [Motives of Paranoid Crime]. 
Benjamin Péret,  [In Paradise of the Phantoms]. 
 [Thirty reproductions of old and modern automatons]. 
Paul Chardon, . 
Maurice Raynal,  [God - Table - Bowl]. 
 [The workshops of] Brancusi, Despiau, Giacometti, Laurens, Lipchitz, Maillol. . 
André Breton,  [The Automatic Message]. 
 [Study on the plastic art mediums]. 
 [Medianimic etching by Victorien Sardou]. 
Ferdinand Brückner,  [The Age of Peru]. 
XXX,  [Involuntary Scalptures]. 
Salvador Dalí, [On the Terrifying and Edible Beauty of Modern Style Architecture]. 
Photographs of Barcelona by Man Ray, photographs of Paris by Brassai. 
Maurice Heine,  [Note on a Psycho-biological Outbreak of Sexual paresthesia]. 
Igor Markevitch,  [Music is the Art of Recreating the World in the Field of Sounds]. 
Jean Frois-Wittmann,  [Modern Art and the Pleasure Principle]. 
Tristan Tzara,  [Of a Certain Automatism of Taste]. 
Paul Eluard,  [The Most Beautiful Postcards]. 
 [Album of One Hundred and Twenty Five Postcards]. 
 [And One Hundred and Forty Answers to the survey asking Quelle a été la rencontre capitale de votre vie? (What was the most momentous encounter of your life?)].

No. 5: May 12, 1934
Cover by Francisco Borès: 
Maurice Heine,  [Walk Through the Roman Black]. 
Jean Lévy, King Kong. 
Max Ernst,  [The Mysteries of the Forest]. 
André Breton,  [Beauty Will be Convulsive]. 
Paul Eluard,  [By a Very Cold Afternoon of the First Days of 1713 or the World As It Is]. 
Color reproduction of the Epinal image  [The Madness of Men or the World Backwards]. 
René Crevel,  [The Great Model is Looking for and Finding Her Skin]. 
Salvador Dalí,  [The New Colors of Spectral Sex Appeal]. 
Roger Caillois,  [The Praying Mantis]. 
Man Ray,  [Dances-Horizons]. 
Georges Hugnet,  [Little Reverie of the Grand Hunter]. 
G. de Chirico,  [On Silence]. 
E. Tériade,  [Present Aspects of the Plastic Expression], with a colored inset of a painting by Pablo Picasso. 
Reproductions of paintings, sculptures and drawings by Balthus, Beaudin, Borés, Braque, Dalí, Ernst, Gargallo, Giacometti, Huf, Klee, Laurens, Lipchitz, Manés, Miro, Picasso, Rattner, Roger, Roux, and Tanguy.

No. 6: December 5, 1934
Cover by Marcel Duchamp: 
D Pierre Mabille,  [Preface to the eulogy of popular prejudices]. 
Bill Brandt,  [At the Cemetery of the Ancient Galleys]. 
Brassai,  [Sky Hairpiece]. 
Paul Éluard,  [Physics of Poetry], Blake, Goethe (Delacroix), Arnim, (Valentine Hugo), La motte-Fougué, (Rackham), Borel, Poe, (Manet), Baudelaire, (Redon), Lautreamont, (Dalí), Carroll, Nouveau (Rodin), Mallarmé, (Rops, Renoir, Matisse), Maeterlinck, (Minne), Apollinaire, (Picasso, Rouveeyre), Reverdy, (Derain, Matisse), Breton (Derain), Tzara, (Arp, Klee), Eluard, (Ernst, Tanguy), Péret, (Picasso), Char, (Kandinsky). 
Ambroise Vollard,  [Recollections of Cézanne, reproductions of unknown paintings of Cézanne]. 
Paul Valéry,  [Reflection on the Landscape and Other Things]. 
Antoine de Saint-Exupéry,  [A Mirage]. 
Jean Wahl,  [Art and Perception]
C.-F. Ramuz,  [Resemblance]
Henry Charpentier,  [Preface to the Latest Fashion]
Stéphane Mallarmé,  [The Last Fashion]. 
Léon-Paul Fargue, . 
Hans Bellmer,  [Doll. Variations on the Assembling of an Articulated Minor]. 
Salvador Dalí,  [Aerodynamic Apparition of Being-Objects]. 
Pierre Courthion,  [The Sadism of Urs Graf, Documents of the Graphisches Kabinett of Basel]. 
D. Lotte Wolf,  [Psychic Revelations of the Hand. With sixteen facsimile reproductions of scriveners and contemporary artists' handprints]. 
André Breton,  [Lighthouse of the Bride]. 
André Beaudin,  [Etchings for the Illustration of the Bucolics of Virgil]. 
Louise de Vilmorin,  [Tonight]. 
Charles-Henri Puech,  [Meaning and Representation]. 
Maurice Heine,  [The Fairylike Woman]. 
 [A Monument Engraved to the Glory of the Female Foot. Louis Binet, Faithful Illustrator of Fetishism of Rétif]. 
Ėlie Faure, . 
E. Tériade,  [Rehabilitation of the Masterpiece]. 
André Breton,  [The Great Poetic News], preface André Breton, poems by Breton, Péret, Éluard. 
Gisèle Prassinos,  [Tales and Poems]. 
Pierre-Jean Jouve, . 
Benjamin Péret, . 
Paul Éluard,  [She Had Himself Raised Palace]. 
André Breton,  [The Air of Water]. 
XXX,  [Five Little Known Poems].

No. 7: June 10, 1935
Cover by Joan Miró: 
E, Tériade,  [The Skin of the Painting]. 
Man Ray,  [Portraits of Women]. 
Roger Caillois,  [Mimicry and Legendary Psychasthenia]. 
Photographic documents by Le Charles. 
Henri Michaun,  [An All Perished Horse]. 
Jacques Baron,  [The Blonde Way, etchings by André Beaudin for the illustration of "Bucoliques" by Virgile]. 
Paul Eluard,  [Applied]. 
Illustrations by Bellmer and Man Ray. 
Maurice Raynal, Hors-texte en couleurs [Borès, color inset]. 
Maurice Heine,  [Romantic Nights Under the Sun King]. 
Young,  [The Day is Too Short]. 
Young,  [It's Still Not Too Late]. 
Photography by Brassai and Man Ray. 
Georges Pudelko, Paolo Uccello. 
Jacques Delamain,  [Night Birds]. 
Photography by Fischer. 
André Breton,  [The Night of the Sunflower]. 
Photography by Brassai and Rogi André. 
Salvador Dalí,  [Non-Euclidean Psychology of a Photograph]. 
A. Petitjean,  [Spectral Analysis of the Monkey]. 
Photography by Juliette Lasserre. 
Balthus, . 
Georges Lafourcade,  [Swinburne Novelist or "The Policeman's Daughter"]. 
Man Ray,  [The Revolving Doors]. 
Herbert Read, . 
Paul Recht,  [Retrospective View of 1937].

No. 8: June 15, 1936
Cover by Salvador Dalí: 
Pierre Mabille,  [Notes on Symbolism]. 
E. Tériade,  [Surrealist Painting]. 
André Breton,  [Of a decalcomania without preconceived object (Decalcomania of Desire)]. 
Benjamin Péret,  [Between Dog and Wolf]. 
Decalcomania Illustrations by Jacqueline Breton, Oscar Dominguez, Georges Hugnet, Marcel Jean, and Yves Tanguy. 
André Breton,  [Starry Castle]. 
Drawings by Max Ernst. 
Maurice Heine,  [Perspectives on anthropoclastic Hell]. 
Salvador Dalí,  [Spectral Surrealism of the Pre-Raphaelite Eternal Feminine]. 
Georges Bataille, . 
Edward James,  [Three Droughts]. 
Drawings by Salvador Dalí.

No. 9: October 15, 1936
Cover by Henri Matisse:
E. Tériade,  [Constancy of Fauvism, Reproductions of recent works by Henri Matisse, Color inset: Still life of Henri Matisse]. 
Roger Caillois,  [The Midi Complex]. 
Maurice Raynal,  [Reality and Mythology of Cranach, 17 reproductions of works of Cranach]. 
 [Color inset: "The Massacre of the Innocents" by Poussin]. 
Edward James, The Marvel of Minuteness, Color inset "Jane Seymour" by Hans Holbein. 
André Breton,  [The Marvelous Against the Mystery. About Symbolism]. 
12 portraits of symbolist poets. Three watercolors by Picasso, 1 color inset. 
Lionello Venturi,  [On the Last Years of Cézanne], 16 unpublished reproductions of works by Cézanne. 
Jacques Prévert,  [Terracotta of Boeotia], 17 unpublished reproductions of Boeotian terracottas from the National Museum of Athens. 
Georges Duthuit,  [Edgar Degas at Ambroise Vollard], 9 reproductions of the latest works of Degas. 
Audiberti,  [Birth of a man]. 
Maurice Heine,  [Engraved Martyrdoms], 8 reproductions of old engravings. 
Edward James,  [The People's Hat], 3 reproductions in color insets. 
Salvador Dalí,  [First Morphological Law on Hair in Soft Structures]. 
Le Corbusier,  [Louis Sutter, the unknown in his sixties].

No. 10: December 1937
Cover by René Magritte: 
Harold Muller, It's a Bird. 
André Breton,  [Storm Heads]. 
Portraits by Lichtenberg, Grabbe, Brisset, Roussel, Kafka, Forneret. 
Xavier Forneret,  [The diamond of the grass], illustrations by Wolfgang Paalen. 
Franz Kafka, illustrations by Max Ernst. 
J.-G. Posada,  [Wood]
Benjamin Péret,  [Nature Devours the Progress and Exceeds It]. 
Pierre Mabille,  [The Luminous Conscience]. 
Reproductions by Rob. Flud and Man Ray. 
Jean Lévy, comments by Gilbert Lély. 
 [Seasons, French School of XVII Century]. 
Raoul Ubac,  [The Triumph of Sterility]. 
Man Ray,  [Aurora of Objects]. 
Maurice Heine, . 
Paul Eluard,  [First Old Sights, Reproductions of works by] André Berton, G. de Chirico, Max Ernst, René Magritte, Joan Miró, Pablo Picasso, and Man Ray. 
Marcel Duchamp,  [Appointment of February 6, 1916]. 
 [Surrealism Around the World. Reproduction of Surrealist Documents] Reproduction of works from Hans Arp, Hans Bellmer, Victor Brauner, Serge Brignoni, Cornell, Salvador Dalí, Paul Delvaux, Oscar Dominguez, Marcel Duchamp, Espinoza, Max Ernst, Georges Hugnet, René Magritte, Juan Miro, Henry Moore, Paul Nash, Wolfgang Paalen, Roland Penrose, Remedios Varo, Kurt Seligmann, J. Styrsky, and Yves Tanguy.

No. 11: May 15, 1938

Cover by Max Ernst:
Pierre Mabille,  [Unpublished drawings by Seurat]. 
Albert Béguin,  [The Androgynous]. 
Pierre Mabille,  [Mirrors: Photographs by Raoul Ubae]. 
Georges Pudelko,  [Piero de Cosimo, Bizarre Painter]. 
Jean Cazaux,  [Revolt and Docility in Surrealist Poetic Invention]. 
Maurice Heine,  [You will be as Gods]. 
Georges Hugnet,  [Riddles]. 
Paul Recht,  [Botticcelli and the Plague]. 
Jacques C. Brunius,  [In the Shadow Where Eyes Are Tied]. Matta Echaurren,  [Sensitive Mathematics, Architecture of Time]. 
Paul Eluard,  [The Middle Way]. 
Nicolas Calas,  [The Love of the Revolution to Our Days]. 
Benjamin Péret,  [Inside Armor, Photographs by Raoul Ubac]. Paul Recht,  [The Man Who Loses His Shadow], photography by Brassai, after Jacques Berthier. Reproductions of drawings by André Masson and Georges Seurat. 
Paintings by Hans Arp, Max Ernst, Yves Tanguy, Wolfgang Paalen, Ecole de Botticelli, Piero di Cosimo, Bartolomeo Veneto.

No. 12-13: May 12, 1939
Cover by André Masson, with inner cover by Diego Rivera: G. H. Lichtenberg,  (Goettingue 1798) [List of a collection of tools, to be auctioned, published the house of Sir H. S. next week.] (Götting 1798). Translation and illustrations by Wolfgang Paalen. Color insert of a painting by Areimboldo. André Breton,  [André Masson's Prestige]. André Breton,  [The Most Recent Tendencies in Surrealist Painting]. Color inserts: paintings by Chirico, Tanguy, Paalen, Ford, Mata, and Seligmann. Reproductions of paintings: Brauner, Dominguez, Frances, Frida Rivera, and Ubac. Pierre Courthion,  [Passage of Géricault]. Madeleine Landsberg,  [Caspar David Friedrich, Painter of Romantic Anxiety]. André Breton,  [Souvenir of Mexico], Photography by Manuel Alvarez Bravo. Pierre Mabille,  [The Eye of the Painter]. Kurt Seligmann,  [Interview with a Tsimshian]. Benjamin Péret,  [Ruins: Ruin of the Ruins]. La Rédaction,  [Writing, Nationalism in Art]. Kurt Muller,  [Unpublished Documents on the Count of Lautréamont and His Work]. Notes from the Editor. ,  [Maldoror and the Belle Dame]. Pierre Mabille,  [The Sky of Lautréamont]. Docteur Pierre Menard,  [Analysis of Lautréamont's Writing]. Léon Corcuff,  [From a Funeral Process Useful to the Passive Defense]. Jean Giono,  [On a Great Book].  [Original Woods by Mailiol]

See also
 Documents, a surrealist journal edited by Georges Bataille from 1929 to 1930
 Acéphale, a surrealist review created by Bataille, published from 1936 to 1939
 View, an American art magazine, primarily covering avant-garde and surrealist art, published from 1940 to 1947
 VVV, a New York journal published by émigré European surrealists from 1942 through 1944

References

External links
Paris: the Heart of Surrealism
Minotaure at 'the nonist', Retrieved August 2010
Guggenheim Blogs https://www.guggenheim.org/blogs/findings/minotaure-surrealist-magazine-1930s
The Menil Collection: Minotaure Journal Conservation https://www.menil.org/read/articles/9-minotaure-journal-conservation

1933 establishments in France
1939 disestablishments in France
Defunct magazines published in France
French-language magazines
Magazines established in 1933
Magazines disestablished in 1939
Magazines published in Paris
Surrealist magazines
French art publications
Avant-garde magazines